is a Japanese voice actress, singer and writer who was born in Ichinomiya, Aichi. She is best known for providing the voice of Sakura Kinomoto in the anime series Cardcaptor Sakura and before that, she voiced some of SNK's characters, such as Yuri Sakazaki in drama CD adaptation of The King of Fighters '94, Cham Cham in drama CD adaptation of Samurai Shodown II and Sakura Mitsukoshi in the Neo Geo puzzle game Money Puzzle Exchanger.

Tange has done voice acting for anime, radio shows, computer games and live events. She worked for Aoni Production and Konami, and had retired from voice acting for a period since 2000, but announced her return to being an anime voice actress in September 2009. She has released music under several artist names, including Little Seraph, Angelic Alice, Angel, and Sakura.

Filmography

Television animation
1994
Nintama Rantarou (season 2), Yuki
Marmalade Boy, Suzu Sakuma
1995
Sailor Moon SuperS, Miharu Akiyama (Ep.139)
1996
You're Under Arrest (season 1), Saga Saori
1997
Android Announcer Maico 2010, MAICO
Burn Up Excess, Lilica Ebett
Maze, Mill
Anime Ganbare Goemon, Omitsu
1998
Gasaraki, Sunao Murai
Cardcaptor Sakura, Sakura Kinomoto
1999
Infinite Ryvius, Kozue Izumi
Trouble Chocolate, Hinano
I'm Gonna Be An Angel!, Muse
2009
Anyamaru Tantei Kiruminzuu, Kanon Hatori
2010
The World God Only Knows, Yotsuba Sugimoto
2011
Dog Days, Violet Amaretto
2012
Aquarion Evol, Crea Dolosera
Detective Conan, Yonehara Sakurako 
Dog Days, Violet Amaretto
2014
The Irregular at Magic High School, Haruka Ono
If Her Flag Breaks , Mei Daimyouzamurai 
Girl Friend Beta, Chloe Lemaire
Chaika – The Coffin Princess: Avenging Battle, Chaika Kamaz
2015
Dog Days, Violet Amaretto
2016
Detective Conan, Yonehara Sakurako (Ep.814–815)
2017
Fate/Apocrypha, Assassin of Black/Jack the Ripper
Hozuki's Coolheadedness, Chun
2018
Cardcaptor Sakura: Clear Card, Sakura Kinomoto
Fate/Extra Last Encore, Saber/Nero Claudius
Sword Art Online: Alicization, Cardinal
2019
The Rising of the Shield Hero, Fitoria
2020
Bofuri, Drazō
Princess Connect! Re:Dive, Illya / Illya Ornstein
Auto Boy - Carl from Mobile Land, Purin-chan
2022
Princess Connect! Re:Dive Season 2, Illya / Illya Ornstein
The Rising of the Shield Hero Season 2, Fitoria

Original video animation (OVA)
Astarotte no Omocha! EX (2011), Fii
Miyuki-chan in Wonderland (1995), Yuri
Fire Emblem (1996), Shiida
Burn Up W (1996), Lilica Ebett
Voogie's Angel (1997–1998), Midi
Melty Lancer (1999), Angela
Carnival Phantasm (2011–2012), Saber Extra
Granblue Fantasy The Animation: Kabocha no Lantern (2017), Cagliostro

Film
Cardcaptor Sakura: The Movie (1999), Sakura Kinomoto
Cardcaptor Sakura Movie 2: The Sealed Card (2000), Sakura Kinomoto
A Dog of Flanders (1997), Alois

Video games
Tokimeki Memorial (1994), Akiho Minori
Dead or Alive (1996), Kasumi
Money Idol Exchanger (1997), Mitsukoshi Sakura/Exchanger 
Princess Quest (1998), Custard
Ayakashi Ninden Kunoichiban (PlayStation) (1998), Tsukiha Hisano
Dead or Alive 2 (1999), Kasumi
Loveplus (2009), Kobayakawa Rinko
Fate/Extra (2010), Saber/Nero Claudius
Dead or Alive: Dimensions (2011), Kasumi Alpha, Alpha-152
Rune Factory Oceans (2011), Electra
Granblue Fantasy (2014), Cagliostro, Macula Marius
Fate/Grand Order (2015), Nero Claudius, Jack the Ripper
Fate/Extella: The Umbral Star (2016), Nero Claudius
Mobius Final Fantasy (2015), Echo
Honkai Impact 3rd (2017), Sirin
Magia Record (2017), Kazumi Subaru
Azur Lane (2017), Kitakaze, I-168
Dragalia Lost (2018), Mitsuhide
Princess Connect! Re:Dive (2018), Illya / Illya Ornstein
Grimms Notes Repage (2019), Aesop
100% Orange Juice (2020), Alicianrone
Granblue Fantasy Versus (2020), Cagliostro
Girls' Frontline (2020), V-pm5, KH2002
Blue Archive (2021), Renkawa Cherino
Fate/Grand Order Arcade (2021), Draco/Beast VI/S
Fire Emblem Heroes (2022), Embla
Sword Art Online: Last Recollection (2023), Cardinal

Drama CDs
The King of Fighters '94 (1995), Yuri Sakazaki
Samurai Shodown II (1995), Cham Cham
D.N.Angel Wink (1999), Risa Harada
KOHA✩TALK (????), Nero Claudius

Dubbing
Thomas the Tank Engine and Friends, Nancy
Magic Adventures of Mumfie, Pinkey

Discography

CD singles
 Anata ni Aitakute～Missing You～Millennium Dance Version (Sakura Tange & Kyouko Hikami) 6 May 2000 (AVDA-14015)
 C.H.O.C.O. (Sakura Tange & Kyouko Hikami) 15 December 1999 (AVDA-14006)
 Anata no Yarikata de Dakishimete 1 January 1997 (KIDA-7620)
 Make You Smile 21 June 1997 (KIDA-7626)
 Tune My Love 24 July 1997 (KIDA-7628)
 2 Shoku dake no Palette 21 August 1997 (KIDA-7630)
 Catch Up Dream 27 March 1998 (KIDA-7640)
 Free 4 September 1998 (KIDA-7647)
 Stand By Me 27 November 1998 (KIDA-7649)
 Wonder Network/Private Link 5 March 1999 (KIDA-7652)
 Bright Shine on Time 23 July 1999 (KMDS-1)
 To Love 22 September 1999 (KMDS-2)
 Mirai Kara no Air Mail 3 February 2000 (KMCS-7)

Singles as Little Seraph
 AIR COMMUNICATION 24 November 2000 (WFCC-2001)
 Kiseki no Kaze 24 March 2001 (WFCC-2002)
 SUN SPLASH 31 August 2001 (WFCC-2005)
 HOLY LOVE 25 January 2002 (WFCC-2009)

Singles as Angel
 ANGEL 　
 SMILE 　
 CHEER
 HAPPY
 SWEET
 PEACE
 HEALING

Singles as Sakura
 Cherry A La Mode～Hajimemashite～ 28 April 2004 (WYCC-4000)
 Cherry A La Mode～Ogenki desu ka?～ 30 June 2004 (WYCC-4001)
 Cherry A La Mode～Takaramono～ 29 September 2004 (WYCC-4002)
 Cherry A La Mode～Arigatou～ 22 December 2004 (WYCC-4003)
 Cherry A La Mode～Koko ni iru yo～ 23 March 2005 (WYCC-4005)
 Cherry A La Mode～Ohayou～ 29 June 2005 (WYCC-4006)
 Cherry A La Mode～Oyasumi～ 28 September 2005 (WYCC-4007)

Singles as Nero Claudius 
 Grand June 2015

Singles as Cagliostro 

 Nanokakan Kakete Sekai wo Tsukuru yori Kawaii Onnanoko Hitori Tsukutta Hou ga Ii ~GRANBLUE FANTASY~ 26 October 2016 (SVWC-70199)

CD albums
 Love Stories 25 November 1995 (TKCA-70769)
 Be Myself 21 November 1996 (KICA-7726)
 MAKE YOU SMILE 3 October 1997 (KICA-7802)
 New Frontier 23 September 1998 (KICA-789)
 Alice 26 March 1999 (KICA-7956)
 SAKURA TANGE INSTRUMENTAL TRACKS
 Neo-Generation 22 October 1999 (KMCS-4)
 SAKURA 16 March 2000 (KMCS-8)
 MARINE 3 August 2000 (KMCS-9)
 SPUR 24 January 2001 (KMCS-19)
 Sakura Kimi ni Sakimasu You ni 29 April 2009 (WYCC-4013) (Mini-album)

Albums as Little Seraph
 WONDER MUSEUM 5 October 2001 (WFCC-2006)
 WONDER MUSEUM 2 1 January 2003 (WFCC-2014)
 FULL VOICE (Mini-album) 31 October 2004 (WFCC-2020)

Albums as Angel
 Cherish
 Rainbow 29 October 2003

Albums as Sakura
 Cherry A La Mode Collection 1 23 February 2005 (WYCC-4004)
 Cherry A La Mode Collection 2 7 December 2005 (WYCC-4008)
 Sora to Kaze to Kimi to Boku 25 October 2006 (WYCC-4009)
 ～10th Anniversary Best～ Sakura Selection 21 March 2007 (WYCC-4010)
 venusnote 14 November 2007 (WYCC-4012)

Albums as Tange Sakura
 桜きみに咲きますように… 29 April 2009
 Musees de Sakura 10 February 2010

References

External links
 Official blog 
  
 
 

1973 births
Living people
Japanese lyricists
Japanese video game actresses
Japanese voice actresses
Musicians from Aichi Prefecture
People from Ichinomiya, Aichi
20th-century Japanese women singers
20th-century Japanese singers
21st-century Japanese women singers
21st-century Japanese singers